Grenada has competed at every edition of the Pan American Games since the tenth edition of the multi-sport event in 1987. Sprinter Hazel-Ann Regis won the country's first Pan Am medal in 2003, a silver in the women's 400 metres. To date, all four of Grenada's medals have been won in the sport of track and field. Grenada did not compete at the first and only Pan American Winter Games in 1990.

The country won its first ever gold medal at the 2019 Pan American Games in Lima, with Anderson Peters winning gold in the javelin throw event.

Medal count

References